Balladyna is an album by Polish jazz trumpeter and composer Tomasz Stańko recorded in 1975 and released on the ECM label.

Reception
The Allmusic review by Michael G. Nastos awarded the album 3½ stars stating "as pleasant as it is to listen to all the way through, it is equally satisfying, and lies deep within the souls of these four adroit and accomplished musicians playing together as one".

Track listing

Personnel
Tomasz Stańko: trumpet
Tomasz Szukalski: tenor saxophone, soprano saxophone
Dave Holland: bass
Edward Vesala: drums

References

ECM Records albums
Tomasz Stańko albums
1976 albums
Albums produced by Manfred Eicher